Hidden Gold is a 1940 American Western film directed by Lesley Selander and written by Gerald Geraghty and Jack Merserveau. The film stars William Boyd, Russell Hayden, Minor Watson, Ruth Rogers, Britt Wood, Ethel Wales and Lee Phelps. The film was released on June 7, 1940, by Paramount Pictures.

Plot

Cast 
 William Boyd as Hopalong Cassidy
 Russell Hayden as Lucky Jenkins
 Minor Watson as Ed Colby
 Ruth Rogers as Jane Colby
 Britt Wood as Speedy
 Ethel Wales as Matilda Purdy
 Lee Phelps as Sheriff Cameron
 Roy Barcroft as Henchman Hendricks
 George Anderson as Ward Ackerman
 Eddie Dean as Logan
 Ray Bennett as Henchman Fleming 
 Jack Rockwell as Stage Driver Pete

References

External links 
 
 
 
 

1940 films
American black-and-white films
1940s English-language films
Films directed by Lesley Selander
Paramount Pictures films
American Western (genre) films
1940 Western (genre) films
Hopalong Cassidy films
1940s American films